Doug Galt (born 1937 or 1938) is a former politician in Ontario, Canada. He was a Progressive Conservative member of the Legislative Assembly of Ontario from 1995 to 2003, and an unsuccessful contender for the House of Commons of Canada in 2004.

Background
Galt was a veterinarian before entering political life.  He was an overseas veterinary pathologist and project coordinator for CIDA in 1988 and 1992, and retired as head of the Brighton Veterinary Services Lab in 1994. In the late 1980s, he attended Queen's University and earned a Master's Degree in public administration. Galt currently lives in the hamlet of Salem, Ontario with his wife Catherine.

Politics
He began his political career at the municipal level, serving as a warden in Northumberland County, and as reeve of Cramahe Township. Galt was also a school trustee, and chaired the Colborne-Cramahe Community Economic Development Commission in 1994.

Galt was elected to the Ontario legislature in the 1995 provincial election, defeating incumbent Liberal Joan Fawcett by over 6,000 votes in the Northumberland riding.  The Progressive Conservatives won the election under the leadership of Mike Harris, and Galt sat as a backbench supporter. He became known for asking "softball" questions (i.e. inoffensive questions which praise the sitting government, and allow ministers to outline new policy initiatives).

Galt was re-elected in the 1999 provincial election, though by only 903 votes over Liberal Carolyn Campbell. He introduced a resolution in the Legislature to bring forward greater protection against cruelty to animals and tried to ban riding in the back of pick-up trucks. Galt also introduced a Private Member's Bill to create a Robert Baldwin Day in Ontario which was later endorsed by Andrew Redden in an article published in the Canadian Parliamentary Review.  In 2000, Galt precipitated a minor crisis in the legislature by accidentally reading out the names of certain young offenders, whose identities were protected by law. Galt was actually praising the young offenders for graduating from a young offenders program while forgetting that they were still young offenders. Rob Sampson, the Minister of Correctional Services, had to temporarily resign from office to show ministerial accountability for Galt's error.

Galt served as chair of the Premier's Task Force on Rural Economic Renewal, which toured the province and consulted with other jurisdictions. Amongst other initiatives, the findings of this Task Force led to the creation of the O.S.T.A.R. program and Rural Economic Development funding initiative.

Galt supported Ernie Eves to replace Harris as party leader in 2002, and was named by Eves as a minister without portfolio and chief government Whip on August 22 of that year.

The Progressive Conservatives were defeated in the 2003 provincial election, and Galt lost his seat to Liberal candidate Lou Rinaldi by approximately 2,500 votes.

Cabinet positions

Federal politics
In early 2004, Galt supported Tony Clement's unsuccessful campaign to become leader of the Conservative Party of Canada.

Galt himself ran as a Conservative in the 2004 federal election, challenging Liberal incumbent Paul Macklin in the federal riding of Northumberland. Macklin defeated Galt by 313 votes.

Electoral record

References

External links
 

Conservative Party of Canada candidates for the Canadian House of Commons
Canadian veterinarians
Male veterinarians
Progressive Conservative Party of Ontario MPPs
Living people
1930s births